Patrik Näslund (born April 10, 1992) is a Swedish professional ice hockey winger, currently playing for Asplöven HC in the HockeyAllsvenskan.

Playing career
Näslund signed a contract with Borås HC of HockeyAllsvenskan for the 2012–13 season. In July Borås HC were forced to relegate to Division 1 due to economic reasons, Näslund then signed a contract with Asplöven HC who were promoted and took Borås' spot in HockeyAllsvenskan.

Career statistics

Regular season and playoffs

References

External links

1992 births
Living people
Frölunda HC players
Swedish ice hockey forwards